Ransom for Alice! is a 1977 American TV movie starring Gil Gerard and Yvette Mimieux.

The Los Angeles Times called it "pleasant rather than riveting".

References

External links
Ransom for Alice at IMDb
Ransom for Alice at TCMDB
Ransom for Alice at BFI

1977 television films
1977 films
American television films